Sagua may refer to:

Settlements
Sagua la Grande, a municipality in the Province of Villa Clara, Cuba
Sagua de Tánamo, a municipality in the Province of Holguín, Cuba
Sagua la Chica, a village in the municipality of Camajuaní, Villa Clara Province, Cuba
Isabela de Sagua, a village in the municipality of Sagua la Grande, Villa Clara Province, Cuba

Rivers and mountains
Sagua River, a river in Guam
Sagua la Grande River, the second longest Cuban river, in Villa Clara Province
Sagua la Chica River, a Cuban river in Villa Clara Province
Sagua de Tánamo River, a Cuban river in Holguín Province
Nipe-Sagua-Baracoa, a mountain range of southwestern Cuba

See also
Sauga, a borough in Estonia
Xagua (disambiguation)